Adebayo Salami  popularly known by his stage name Oga Bello  (born 9 May 1952), is a veteran Nigerian actor, filmmaker, film producer, and director.

Family
Adebayo is married with two wives and Eighteen children (9 sons and 9 daughters)

Career
Although Salami is of Kwara descent, he was born on 9 May 1953 in Lagos State where he had both his primary and secondary education.

He began his acting career in 1964, with a group called Young Concert Party, under the leadership of Ojo Ladipo, popularly known as  Baba Mero. After a few years, the group changed its name to Ojo Ladipo Theatre Group, and later metamorphosed into Awada Kerikeri Theatre Group. Following the demise of Ojo Ladipo in 1978, Salami took the mantle of leadership of the group, which brought him into the limelight.

He featured in the first Yoruba film,  Ajani Ogun, in which the late Adeyemi Afolayan, the father of Kunle Afolayan and Gabriel Afolayan, plays the lead role.

He also featured in a movie titled Kadara by Adeyemi Afolayan (Ade love). He later featured in the popular Nigerian comedy series Comedy half hour with the stage name Oga Bello.

He produced his first movie, Ogun Ajaye, in 1985, from the stable of Awada Kerikeri.

Since 1985, he has produced, directed and featured in several Yoruba movies.

He was a pioneer member of the Association of Nigerian Theatre Arts Practitioners, and also served as president of the association.

Awards
2014 Best of Nollywood Awards

See also
List of Yoruba people
List of Nigerian actors

References

Living people
1953 births
Nigerian male film actors
Yoruba male actors
Male actors from Lagos State
People from Kwara State
20th-century Nigerian male actors
21st-century Nigerian male actors
Male actors in Yoruba cinema
Yoruba filmmakers
Yoruba-language film directors
Nigerian male television actors
Actors from Kwara State